Teachers : A Class Soundtrack is the official soundtrack, on the Channel 4 label, of the first series of British television comedy-drama series Teachers.

This album contains music by various artists, heard in the show itself.

Track listing
 "Buck Rogers" by Feeder
 "Catch the Sun" by Doves
 "Can't Say No" by Lowgold
 "Get A Move On" by Mr Scruff
 "Le Mobilier" by Rinocerose
 "When I Close My Eyes" by Morgan
 "She Left Me On Friday" by Shed Seven
 "I Wanna Be Like You" by The Dandys
 "The Day Before Yesterday's Man" by The Supernaturals
 "Move Over" by Mover
 "Little Arithmetics" by Deus
 "Animal House" by Animal House
 "Sudwest Funk No. 5" by Echoboy
 "Indigo" by Moloko
 "Insomnia" by Faithless
 "Utopia" by Goldfrapp

External links
 Listen to samples at Last.fm
 Teachers: A Class Soundtrack at Play.com
 A Class Soundtrack on Amazon

Television soundtracks
2003 soundtrack albums